William Whittaker (26 December 1883 – 13 August 1980) was a New Zealand lawn bowls player.

Bowls career
At the 1938 Commonwealth Games in Sydney he was part of the men's fours team that won the gold medal; with Bill Bremner, Ernie Jury and Alec Robertson. 

He won the 1940 fours title at the New Zealand National Bowls Championships when bowling for the Onehunga Bowls Club.

References

1883 births
1980 deaths
People from Atherton, Greater Manchester
English emigrants to New Zealand
New Zealand male bowls players
Commonwealth Games gold medallists for New Zealand
Bowls players at the 1938 British Empire Games
Commonwealth Games medallists in lawn bowls
Medallists at the 1938 British Empire Games